Senator Melton may refer to:

Eddie Melton (born c. 1980), Indiana State Senate
Emory Melton (1923–2015), Missouri State Senate

See also
Senator Milton (disambiguation)